Robinson Stadium is a baseball stadium located in Texas City, Texas.  The stadium seats 1,800 people.  It was home to the Bay Area Toros of the Continental Baseball League as well as the Texas City High School baseball team.

Minor league baseball venues
Baseball venues in Texas
High school baseball venues in the United States